Seven Blood-Stained Orchids is a 1972 giallo film directed by Umberto Lenzi, who also co-wrote the screenplay.

Plot 
A killer is driving around the streets of Italy looking for a specific victim who happens to be an older woman that lives alone. The killer breaks in and kills her with a switchblade, and catches a glimpse of the woman's daughter in a photograph before leaving and plots to kill her next. The killer follows through with that by posing as a client of one of her escorts and beating her to death in a field.

Elsewhere, a soon to be married Giulia Torresi is picking a dress for her marriage to a wealthy clothing designer by the name of Mario when she receives a mysterious call from an unknown caller, who simply hangs up when asked their identity. Mario walks in soon after, upset that his design isn't being carried out. Meanwhile, another mysterious call is received by a partygoer named Kathy and like the last one, the caller hangs up when questioned of their identity. This time however, the caller is revealed to be close to the party as he hangs up the phone in a nearby residence and then visually stalks the partygoers from outside the window. Cathy is later followed, where she is attacked and killed in her own home with a phone cord.

After the three murders, Inspector Vismara thinks that a killer is killing women in Rome. His point is further proven when now newlywed Giulia is attacked and presumably killed while on the train to her honeymoon. As it turns out, the funeral was staged in an attempt to catch the killer, but she is very much alive, however is unable to remember the face of her attacker. While the police suspect her groom Mario, Giulia recognizes one of the previous victims faces as a fellow employee at the hotel she formerly worked at. A suspect is pinpointed when Giulia recalls a lover of said employee, who was outed to the police by Giulia for stealing from the hotel. The suspect, Rau is brutally interrogated by Vismara's fellow detectives, Lt. Palumbo and Lt. Renzi. He proclaims his innocence, but fails to give a strong alibi.

Once free from recovery, Giulia second guesses herself and confesses to Mario that she thinks she's accused the wrong man. In the car, she notices that Mario suspiciously has the exact half moon plaque left behind at each murder scene, but stays mostly quiet and brushes it off as coincidence. What does however come out of this discovery is a vague memory of a frequent guest at her hotel who shared a similar half moon on their key chain. Determined to find out the identity of this person, she and Mario race over to the hotel where she had worked.. Unfortunately though, there are no remaining employees working  from around the time the mystery person frequented. Whilst driving back however, she remembers that the names of the previous guests must be legally kept in an official hotel register. Ready to expand on this discovery, they find that the page of the particular date she remembers had been suspiciously ripped out. The manager finds this odd as well considering he remembers that the catalog books were found unorganized a few months prior to the first killing. Later, the page is discovered and is looked over by Mario and Giulia. As it turns out, the mystery person, whom she remembers to be an American man's name, is missing. What is present though is a list of women: Anita Ferri, Kathy Adams, Elena Marchi, Concetta de Rosa, Anna Sartori, as well as Inez and Giulia who had worked at the hotel.

After not being able to relax and have a proper honeymoon, Mario and Giulia return to Italy to carry out their own investigation, starting with paying the third woman on the list a visit. Said woman, Elena Marchi now resides at a home for the unstable surrounded with an iron gate. Once they finally come across the home with the right iron gate, Mario wanders off into the building determined to speak to Elena whilst Giulia stays in the car. He is at first denied access to visiting her at what would be around the time she typically winds down. Due to his tenacious effort, he successfully persuades the nurse to check in on her. Unfortunately though, the damage is already done and Mario catches a brief glimpse of the killer dressed head to toe in black escaping Elena's room, who had been drowned in her own bathtub. Mario chases the figure into a dark corridor where he is slashed, on his shoulder, from behind by the killer's blade. After this, even Giulia catches a more lengthy glimpse of the killer escaping through the window and hopping over the gate. Still unable to describe the murderer to authority, suspicions are further cast on Mario for just being in the right place at the right time. This theory even comes across as plausible to Vismara, who originally wasn't on board with this idea that was more so presented by Lt. Renzi.

The following day, Vismara and Lt. Palumbo pay Concetta de Rosa a visit while teaching her class. As one of the names on what seems to be the killer's hit list, and with 4 of the 7 being either attacked or killed, they inform her that she might be in danger of being next. Mario, now strictly focused on finding the identity of the American man, as he is confident is the murderer, goes to a sketch artist. A sketch is developed of the man, prompting Mario to go to numerous hotspots around the area to see if anyone recognizes the sketch. These areas include a parish house where a friendly farsighted priest is introduced to the illustration. He draws a complete blank and sends Mario to another local hangout for artists like the one who drew the picture of the American man. One student recognizes the man as a friend of someone named Barrett. With this, Mario finds Barrett, who recognizes the sketch immediately as someone named Frank Saunders. From what he understood, Frank got “hung up” on some girl and never saw him since. Mario, realizing that one of the women on the list might be the girl, leaves knowing more than what he came for.

An odd circumstance comes up when the parish priest, briefly seen during Mario's investigation, informs the police that the teacher, Concetta de Rosa, had not attended church as usual. Assuming the worst has happened, the authorities rush to where she was last seen. Nothing seems out of the ordinary until a sheet is lifted revealing her corpse with the signature half moon.

The killer, now dubbed as “The Half Moon Maniac” has now gathered five victims with more to come. Mario receives a clue to where Frank Saunders might be located from an anonymous tipster. After going to the address stated, Mario finds out the unfortunate truth. His suspect, Frank Saunders, had died in an automobile accident two years prior.

Anna Sartori, a name not explored much on the list, arrives in Italy only to be immediately confronted by the police about her being a part of a list of murder victims. Her arrival is also being watched by The Half Moon Maniac, whose gloved hand is seen fidgeting with the signature half moon trinket. Anna's husband explains she experienced a traumatic event of sorts while briefly living in Italy. Meanwhile, Mario finds himself at the hospital where Frank had died. He meets with a professor who believes Frank's death was caused by someone else behind the wheel. The professor think that it is the woman he got hooked on. He even goes as far as saying that if Frank Saunders hadn't been left to die and was brought up to the hospital one hour sooner, he'd still be alive today. While leaving, Mario encounters the sketch artist suspiciously at the hospital. He explains it as just a coincidence.

With all this new information, Mario bursts into Barrett's home, believing he had lied and is somehow involved in the killings. He however finds Barrett drugged out of his mind and gains nothing from this trip. He returns to the parish house to see if the priest knows the name of the minister who officiated Frank's funeral. Once identified, Mario is hopeful that the minister will remember some of the people who had been in attendance at the funeral. He assumes that one of these names may very well be the maniac taking revenge for the death of a friend. The priest gets this information for him, but to no avail from the minister, who is an older man with a poor memory.

Anna, not able to do practically anything to ensure her safety, sends her identical twin sister, Maria, out to get the newspaper for her. Whilst doing so, she is mistaken for Anna and is drilled to death by the maniac.

At this point, Giulia is sick of hiding out and hatches a plan to catch the murderer by announcing her state to the public. The plan goes sideways and she faints due to the shock. It's later explained by Vismara that her state of shock was caused by miscommunication that they would be testing the plan first. Now with the authorities trusting him, Mario takes them to his new favorite suspect, Barrett, who upon arrival had committed suicide by hanging, implying to he killed himself due to the guilt of the murders. Mario, now unsure whether or not this was actually a suicide visits Anna. Naturally considering the circumstances, she is distraught, but is still interrogated into admitting that she was indeed the driver during Frank's accident. She had left him to die in order for her husband to never find out about their affair. With this exposed, she identifies the only living relative of Frank's she knows. His brother, who she describes as very different from Frank, nearly bald, a man with a kind face with a cleft in his chin and someone who is shortsighted. He also was the one that gave Frank the half moon plaque to begin with. Mario realizes during said description this is a person he has met before.

Giulia, who is at home by herself, hears her record abruptly end and assumes it's Mario. After finding a half moon on her record player, she encounters the priest with a garrote standing in the doorway of one of the rooms. Realizing he was the killer, she runs to her pool area where she is followed and confronted by the priest. He explains that the killings were sparked out of the fact that one of the many women on the list had to have been the one to abandon his brother and left him to die in the car accident in which they were responsible. He kills them all in order to make sure he gets the right one. He also reveals that he killed Barrett and staged it as a suicide in order to keep everyone off his trail. After this explanation, he lunges at her and begins strangling her with the garrote, but Mario arrives just in the nick of time and drowns the vengeful clergy in the pool, killing him and ending the killings. Relived, Mario and Giulia walk away holding hands.

Cast 
 Antonio Sabàto as Mario Gerosa
 Uschi Glas as Giulia Torresi
 Pier Paolo Capponi as Inspector Vismara
 Petra Schürmann as Concetta Di Rosa 
 Marisa Mell as Anna Sartori / Maria Sartori
 Gabriella Giorgelli as Ines Tamborini aka Toscana
 Renato Romano as The Priest
 Claudio Gora as Raffaele Ferri
 Rossella Falk as Elena Marchi
 Marina Malfatti as Kathy Adams
 Bruno Corazzari as Barrett
 Linda Sini as Wanda
 Aldo Barberito as Lt. Palumbo
 Franco Fantasia as Lt. Renzi
 Nello Pazzafini as Giovanni Rau
 Ivano Davoli as Dr. Palmieri
 Enzo Andronico as Hotel Director
 Carla Mancini as Anna's maid

Production
Towards the 1970s, Umberto Lenzi began focusing his attention on poliziotteschi films and his contributions to making gialli began to deteriorate. The score in the film by Riz Ortolani borrows liberally from his previous scores, including So Sweet...So Perverse and Perversion Story.

The appearance of German actress Uschi Glas was imposed on by the German co-producers, who promoted the film as both a krimi film and an Edgar Wallace adaptation. Editor Clarissa Ambach is credited only in the German version of the film.

Reception
Lenzi later declared the film to be "superbly shot" as well as having a "pendantic" story.

Releases
There are several releases of the film on DVD, as well as a recent 2018 transfer to Blu-ray by Code Red.

References

Footnotes

External links

Seven Blood Stained Orchids at Variety Distribution

1970s crime thriller films
Giallo films
West German films
Films directed by Umberto Lenzi
Films scored by Riz Ortolani
Supernatural slasher films
1970s slasher films
1970s Italian films